The Lazio regional election of 1980 took place on 8 June 1980.

Events
Christian Democracy became the largest party, ahead of the Italian Communist Party. After the election Giulio Santarelli, the incumbent Socialist President, continued to govern at the head of a coalition consisting of Christian Democracy. In 1983 Santarelli was replaced by Bruno Landi, who was succeeded by Gabriele Panizzi in 1984.

Results

Source: Ministry of the Interior

Elections in Lazio
1980 elections in Italy